Compsoctena connexalis is a moth in the family Eriocottidae. It was described by Francis Walker in 1863. It is found in South Africa.

Adults are dark cinereous (ash gray), the forewings with a few black points near the base, and with three dark brown marks, which have black and silvery borders. These marks consist of two interior spots and a broad exterior undulating streak, which is forked towards the costa. The marginal line is silvery, with an exterior blackish border, which is interrupted by some silvery streaks on the brownish-cinereous fringe. The hindwings are brownish cinereous.

References

Endemic moths of South Africa
Moths described in 1863
Compsoctena
Lepidoptera of South Africa